Bandit were an English rock band, formed in 1976 and disbanded in 1979. They are not to be confused with the same Bandit from the US who released their only album in 1975 on ABC Records, nor any other act with the same name since.

Background

Bandit released two albums with different line-ups. Bandit's debut Bandit was released in late 1976 on Arista Records. This album featured Jim Diamond on lead vocals, Danny McIntosh on guitar, future AC/DC bassist Cliff Williams, James Litherland on guitar and harmonica, and drummer Graham Broad, now of Roger Waters' band. All except Williams wrote, though Diamond wrote about half the material.  A single entitled "Ohio" (written by Diamond) was released from the album, but failed to chart. The punk rock music scene of the time caused a lack of attention and the band later parted ways. Diamond went on to join PhD, and gained a UK Top 10 hit with "I Won't Let You Down".  He later went solo and scored two more chart-toppers.

The band continued, undergoing an almost total overhaul, with only guitarist McIntosh remaining.  New recruits were Gerry Trew on lead vocals, drummer Theodore Thunder (real name John Dentith), and bassist Tony Lester.  Lester now wrote the bulk of the band's material.

The second album, Partners in Crime, was produced by Matthew Fisher of Procol Harum and released by Ariola Records in 1978. "One Way Love", a single from the album (penned by Lester) reached No. 76 on the American Billboard chart. 

A third album was recorded and featured guitarist Mick Grabham of Procol Harum (replacing McIntosh) but was never released and finally the band broke up. A five-song EP from the unreleased album was released in 2016 entitled Bandit3 EP. The band's final tour was with John Miles in 1979 with the lineup Trew, Lester, Grabham and Thunder.

Both full-length Bandit albums are long out of print. McIntosh is now the guitarist for, and husband of, the singer-songwriter Kate Bush.

References

External links

British rock music groups
Musical groups established in 1976
Musical groups disestablished in 1978
1976 establishments in the United Kingdom